Luciano Cáceres (born January 24, 1977 in Flores, Buenos Aires, Argentina) is an Argentine actor. He is primarily known for exclusively playing villain roles in most of the telenovelas he appears on.

Biography 
His father had a theater, Teatro de la calle Rincón. He worked in the municipality and lived in the province. He stayed there and had a mattress under the stage. His mother was a co-worker in the municipality and had been married for nine years. When Cáceres was a child, he watched his father work. He performed in a play called  and had already learned the librettos. Cáceres completed his secondary studies at the Instituto Medalla Milagrosa. At eleven he began to work in theater.

Career 
When he was nine years old, the Pharmaceutical Union opened a free course and Cáceres attended. He studied with Alejandra Boero and at age ten, when he met her, Boero asked him why he wanted to be an actor. Some time later his son Alejandro Samek premiered the play , which was the first play in which he performed.

Television

Movies

Awards and nominations

References

External links
 Official site

1977 births
Argentine male actors
Living people